The Sim Gideon Power Plant is a 620 megawatt (MW), natural gas fired power plant located near Bastrop, Texas in Bastrop County, Texas.  It is owned and operated by the Lower Colorado River Authority.  The Sim Gideon Power Plant consists of three generating units that operate via simple cycle combustion turbine utilizing natural gas. The plant, along with Lost Pines Power Project 1, is part of the Lost Pines Power Park.

Three generating units compose the Sim Gideon Power Plant:

 Unit 1, completed in 1965, with a generating capacity of 140 MW
 Unit 2, completed in 1968, with a generating capacity of 140 MW
 Unit 3, completed in 1971, with a generating capacity of 340 MW

Cooling water is provided by Lake Bastrop, a  freshwater reservoir, and four wells that produce groundwater from the Simsboro Aquifer.

See also

 List of power stations in Texas

External links
Lower Colorado River Authority page for the Sim Gideon Power Plant

Energy infrastructure completed in 1965
Energy infrastructure completed in 1968
Energy infrastructure completed in 1971
Buildings and structures in Bastrop County, Texas
Natural gas-fired power stations in Texas
Lower Colorado River Authority